Multan Khurd (Punjabi) is a tehsil in Talagang District of Punjab province in Pakistan.

References

Populated places in Talagang District